Carroll Ray "Dink" Mothell (August 13, 1897 – April 24, 1980) was a catcher and utility player who played for 15 years in the Negro leagues. Known for his versatility, Mothell played every position. It was said you could use him "most any place, any time."

During Mothell's time with the Kansas City Monarchs and the All Nations, he often caught for Hall of Fame-nominated and Hall of Fame Negro league pitchers such as José Méndez, John Donaldson, Bullet Rogan, and Andy Cooper. The teams traveled all over the United States, and Mothell was even a part of a Monarchs tour of "The Orient," where they played in places like Manila in 1934.

Personal life
Mothell was buried in Topeka, Kansas shortly after he died in 1984, but did not receive a headstone until June 20, 2011. The grave marker was placed by the Negro Leagues Baseball Grave Marker Project.

References

External links 
 and Baseball-Reference Black Baseball stats and Seamheads
  and Seamheads
 Forgotten star lacks grave marker at The Topeka Capital-Journal

1897 births
1980 deaths
African-American baseball players
Sportspeople from Topeka, Kansas
Baseball players from Kansas
All Nations players
Kansas City Monarchs players
Negro league baseball managers
20th-century African-American sportspeople